Dolichozygus is a monotypic genus of brachiopods belonging to the family Terebratulidae. The only species is Dolichozygus stearnsii.

References

Brachiopod genera
Terebratulida
Monotypic brachiopod genera